The 2010 Indoor Football League season was the second season of the Indoor Football League (IFL). The regular season began on Friday, February 26 and ended on Saturday, June 19. In March, the Indoor Football League took control of the Alaska Wild and intended to operate the team until a new owner was found or the season ended. In May, after nine games and no new ownership identified, the team forfeited its remaining home games, played its final road game against Tri-Cities under league auspices, and then ceased operations. After three weeks of playoffs the season ended with the 2010 United Bowl on July 17 where the Billings Outlaws defeated the Sioux Falls Storm.

Standings

United Conference

Intense Conference

z=clinched top seed in conference, x=clinched division, y=clinched wild card spot

Playoffs

Awards

Individual season awards

1st Team All-IFL

2nd Team All-IFL

References